Paren is a village in the Penzhinsky District, Kamchatka Krai, Russia, which lies along the river Paren. , the population was 65 individuals. The village was settled by Koryaks in the 19th century. Until the 20th century, it was renown for its blacksmithing and produced a Bowie-style knife known as a Paren knife. The postal code is 688866.

References

Rural localities in Kamchatka Krai